Lord Monypenny was a title in the Peerage of Scotland, created in about 1464. It became extinct or dormant on the death of the second Lord.

Lords Monypenny
 William Monypenny, 1st Lord Monypenny (died between 1485 and 1488)
 Alexander Monypenny, 2nd Lord Monypenny (died after 1508)

References
 James Balfour Paul, The Scots Peerage, vol. VI, pp. 275–279.

Extinct lordships of Parliament